The 1951 Montana State Bobcats football team was an American football team that represented Montana State University in the Rocky Mountain Conference (RMC) during the 1951 college football season. In its second and final season under head coach John Mason, the team compiled a 0–7 record.

Schedule

References

Montana State
Montana State Bobcats football seasons
College football winless seasons
Montana State Bobcats football